Luke Evans (born 1979) is a Welsh actor and singer.

Luke Evans may also refer to:
 Luke Evans (politician) (born 1983), British politician
 Luke Evans (cricketer) (born 1987), English cricketer
 Luke Evans (rugby union) (born 1988), Australian rugby union player